Baliguda is a Vidhan Sabha constituency of Kandhamal district, Odisha.

Area of this constituency includes Baliguda, Baliguda block, K. Nuagaon block, Kotagarh block and Tumudibandh block.

In 2009 election,  Bharatiya Janata Party candidate Karendra Majhi defeated Indian National Congress candidate Sadananda Mallik by a margin of 11,193 votes.

Elected Members

15 elections held during 1951 to 2014. Elected members from the Baliguda constituency are:
2014: (82): Rajib Patra (BJD)
2009: (82): Karendra Majhi (BJP)
2004: (102): Karendra Majhi (BJP)
2000: (102): Surendra Kanhar (BJP)
1995: (102): Sahura Mallick (Congress)
1990: (102): Bhagaban Kanhar (Janata Dal)
1985: (102): Laxmikanta Mallik (Congress)
1980: (102): Sahura Mallick (Congress-I)
1977: (102): Sadananda Kanhar (Independent)
1974: (102): Sahura Mallick (Congress)
1971: (97): Naresh Pradhan (Swatantra)
1967: (97): Naresh Pradhan (Swatantra)
1961: (29): Dubara Podra (Ganatantra Parishad)
1957: (23): Lokanath Patra (Ganatantra Parishad)
1951: (10): Yadaba Patra (Congress)

Election results

2019 Election Result

2014 Election Results
In 2014 election, Biju Janata Dal candidate Rajib Patra defeated Indian National Congress candidate Klesa Pradhan by a margin of 2,696 votes.

2009 Election

Notes

References

Assembly constituencies of Odisha
Kandhamal district